One for My Baby is a 10-inch studio album by Frankie Laine, released in 1952 on Columbia Records. It was recorded with Paul Weston and his orchestra and Carl Fischer on the piano.

It was Laines' first album for Columbia. All its eight tracks were previously unreleased, some songs were brand new.

The album was released in three formats: one 10-inch long-playing 33-rpm record, a set of four 7-inch 45-rpm records, and a set of four 10-inch 78-rpm shellac records.

Track listing

References 

1952 albums
Frankie Laine albums
Columbia Records albums